Witchcraft Today is a non-fiction book written by Gerald Gardner.  Published in 1954, Witchcraft Today recounts Gardner's thoughts on the history and the practices of the witch-cult, and his claim to have met practising witches in 1930s England. It also deals with his theory that the Knights Templar had practised the religion, and that the belief in faeries in ancient, mediaeval and early modern Europe is due to a secretive pygmy race that lived alongside other communities. Witchcraft Today is one of the foundational texts for the religion of Wicca, along with Gardner's second book on the subject, 1959's The Meaning of Witchcraft.

Gerald Gardner in the foreword to Witchcraft Today:

Whilst by the time of writing, Gardner had been initiated into the religion, and had formed his own coven, he did not state this in the book, instead he "posed as a disinterested anthropologist". The introduction to the book was written by Margaret Murray, who had widely supported the witch-cult hypothesis in the 1920s and 1930s through her books The Witch-Cult in Western Europe and The God of the Witches. In her introduction, she stated that:

In the book Gardner also repeats the claim, which had originated with Matilda Joslyn Gage, that 9 million victims were killed in the European witch-hunts." Current scholarly estimates of the number of people executed for witchcraft during this time period vary between about 40,000 and 100,000.

The book contains seven photographs; one depicting the author, another a magician's circle at the Museum of Magic and Witchcraft, a memorial to those killed in the witch hunts, two further images of rooms in the museum, a statue of a horned god, and a painting of a male witch."

Publication history
The book was initially published in hardback in November 1954 by Rider and Company, and sold at the price of 15 shillings. It was reprinted in August 1956.

Analysis
In his biography of Gardner, the researcher  Philip Heselton noted that the contents of Witchcraft Today were essentially a summation of what Gardner had read about witchcraft and other related subjects over a number of years. He remarked that Gardner had probably intended to provide a history of the witch-cult from the Stone Age to the present which made reference to related religious movements, such as those of the druids, Knights Templar and ancient Egyptians. Summing the book up, he described it as "a record of Gardner's phases of enthusiasm".

Notes and references

1954 non-fiction books
Wiccan books
Works by Gerald Gardner
1950s in modern paganism
Witchcraft in the United Kingdom